Moholmen Lighthouse is a coastal lighthouse in Vågan Municipality in Nordland county, Norway.

History

Moholmen Lighthouse was originally built in 1914. The original tower was moved to the island of Tranøy in Hamarøy Municipality in 1936. A new tower was built at Moholmen, and that tower was automated in 1974. The white tower is cast iron and built in a square pyramidal shape.

See also
Lighthouses in Norway
List of lighthouses in Norway

References

External links
 Norsk Fyrhistorisk Forening 

Lighthouses completed in 1914
Vågan
Lighthouses in Nordland
Listed lighthouses in Norway